Andrew Keith Best (born 5 January 1959) is an English former professional footballer
 
Best, a right-winger born in Dorchester, Dorset, joined Torquay United in October 1984 from local non-league side Teignmouth, one of a number of players signed for free by Torquay manager David Webb. His league debut came on 23 October 1984 against Scunthorpe United at the Old Show Ground. He made 18 league appearances, scoring twice before leaving for Dawlish Town in 1985.

In February 2001, the Torquay-based Herald Express newspaper reported that Best was still playing for Teignmouth at the age of 42.

References

1959 births
Sportspeople from Dorchester, Dorset
Footballers from Dorset
Living people
English footballers
Torquay United F.C. players
Dawlish United F.C. players
Association football midfielders